Union Sportive des Fonctionnaires is a Malagasy football club based in Antananarivo, Madagascar. The team has won the THB Champions League in 1969, qualifying them for the 1970 African Cup of Champions Clubs.

The team currently plays in the Malagasy Second Division.

Achievements
THB Champions League
Champion (1): 1969

Performance in CAF competitions
CAF Champions League: 1 appearance
1970 – first round

References

External links
:pl:US Fonctionnaires

Football clubs in Madagascar
Antananarivo